The Governor's School for the Arts is a regional secondary arts school sponsored by the Virginia Department of Education and the public school divisions of Chesapeake, Franklin, Isle of Wight County, Norfolk, Portsmouth, Southampton County, Suffolk, and Virginia Beach. It is one of the nineteen Virginian academic-year Governor's Schools and provides intensive educational opportunities for identified gifted students in instrumental music, vocal music, dance, musical theatre, theatre & film, and visual arts. Housed in the newly renovated, historic Monroe Building in downtown Norfolk, students attend afternoon classes at the magnet school during the academic year.

Dance
A wide variety of styles are offered to the students including ballet, modern, jazz, etc. The dancers perform three times a year including a cooperative performance with the Virginia Stage Company. Along with their annual performances, the dance department is responsible for hosting the regional high school dance festival every other year.

Theatre & Film
The program, with an average membership of 50 students, is housed in the Monroe Building/Wells Theatre complex, home of the Virginia Stage Company. A flexible black-box theatre, in the complex, serves as the principal producing space for the theatre program.

Students have the opportunity to work in the Wells Theatre, one of the most architecturally beautiful and theatrically functional theatres of its kind outside of New York; it closely resembles Broadway's Helen Hays Theatre. Instruction takes place in well-equipped classrooms, studios, and rehearsal space, and students receive hands-on experience with state-of-the-art computer lighting and sound equipment.

The department produces about 4 or 5 mainstage and several workshop productions per year. Students have the opportunity to train and perform with professional theatre artists and visiting faculty from university theatre departments. Internships with Virginia Stage Company (LORT C) are available for selected students.

In curriculum, the Theatre Department offers hands-on performance experience in a variety of dramatic styles and periods, ranging from Classical Greek to Shakespeare, Commedia dell'arte and contemporary American writing, including on-camera work and screen material. Students are also provided many courses that are usually not taken until college such as Theatre History, Acting For The Camera, Directing, and Scene Study. Moreover, students are offered the training to support the demands of heightened language and stylized material, preparing them for auditions at the collegiate level. Perhaps most importantly, students benefit from the opportunity to rehearse and perform material that is unavailable in a typical secondary school setting, not to mention the local area. Productions of note include Heathen Valley, The Wrestling Season, The Cripple of Inishmaan, The Laramie Project, The Importance Of Being Earnest, Playing With Fire (The Frankenstein Story) and original student work focused on contemporary issues and civil rights.

Musical theatre
The Musical Theatre Department is the most competitive and the smallest department at the Governor's School for the Arts. The department consists of roughly 30 students with an equal male-to-female ratio. The program is designed to prepare students for professional careers in musical theatre, music/recording, television, film, and popular live performance venues such as Broadway, theme parks, cruise ships, and cabaret.

 In Dance, students are grouped according to ability from beginner to intermediate to advanced. All Musical Theatre students take regular classes in ballet, jazz, tap, and hip hop.
 Vocal coaching focuses on the fundamentals of vocal production, classical literature, musical theatre literature, and also explores the correct and safe execution of the BELT/POP voice along with the development of the legit voice.
 The Acting element attempts to break down any barriers or walls that may exist and help the performer to be more relaxed and confident in the stage environment. The differences between film/television acting and stage acting are discussed and practiced. Monologues and scene work contribute to an advanced refinement of song interpretation and communication.

Instrumental music
With an average enrollment of 80 students, the instrumental music program is one of the largest of the GSA departments. The program offers professional training and a wide variety of performance experience to classical and jazz performers including those interested in conducting, composition and audio engineering.

Instrumental music students are given three hours of intensive training each weekday afternoon in many facets of music including chamber music/jazz combos, sight singing, ear training, eurhythmics, keyboard skills, literature, improvisation, theory, composition, classes in the latest computer technology related to music, audio recording (Pro Tools), sectionals, music business, audition preparation, performance classes and ensembles such as the Big Band, and the Symphony Orchestra. All classes take place in the flourishing musical and academic environment of the downtown Norfolk campus, which includes the Virginia Arts Festival and Todd Rosenlieb Dance.

Governor's School instructors are some of the area's finest performers and educators including members of the Virginia Symphony, faculty of Old Dominion University, administrators of the Virginia Arts Festival, and a collection of experience from all facets of musical life in Hampton Roads and beyond.

Graduates of the Instrumental Music Department that choose music as their profession have continued their studies at some of the top music universities and conservatories in the world including the Eastman School of Music, Rice University, the Juilliard School, the Cleveland Institute of Music, the New England Conservatory, and Manhattan School of Music. Students of GSA have spent their summers studying at the most prestigious music festivals such as the Meadowmount School of Music, Aspen Music Festival, Tanglewood, the Encore School for Strings, the National Repertory Orchestra, and the National Orchestral Institute.

Graduates occupy positions throughout the music world including positions with leading orchestras such as the Boston Symphony and Saint Louis Symphony, seats in the orchestras of Broadway shows, recording contracts with the thriving record industry in Nashville and New York as performers and engineers, and teaching positions at universities and arts schools all over the United States.  Graduates not majoring in music have had equal amount of success in their chosen field, crediting music study as one of the driving elements being their success and lifelong happiness.

Visual arts
The visual arts department encourages in-depth exploration and research in an array of studio courses in the field of printmaking, painting, photography, computer imaging, video imaging additive, subtractive, and constructed sculpture (and welding), design, and other areas such as medical illustration and fashion design. Additionally, students take continuing drawing and art history classes as well as classes that focus on conceptualization, analysis, and criticism.

The schedule for Visual Arts students is based around two-hour elective studios which are taken daily, along with either art history, concepts and criticism. Each student chooses two elective studios from a variety offered each nine weeks. Portfolio development is an integral part of the visual arts program. With guidance from the department chair, students select two electives for each of the four nine-week grading periods. In addition to the typical electives, advanced students may apply for independent study in a particular area.

Vocal music
The Vocal Music Department has an annual total enrollment of 30-40 9th-12th grade vocal students. The department offers in-depth, comprehensive training in all aspects of music, from theory to applied voice. It is classically based and designed for the serious student who has aspirations of singing classical music and opera.

Students perform solo and ensemble roles in student productions, and learn vocal repertoire in opera, operetta, art song, and legitimate musical theatre as well as small- and large-scale choral works. Solo singing is encouraged and expected of all students.

The Vocal Music program provides serious students with intensive focused training that is designed to carefully develop the maturing voice. The program instructs students in all aspects of vocal music and fosters the formation of habits that enable them to use their vocal instruments to the fullest.

To augment this instructional program, vocal music students have the opportunities to attend professional opera performances and meet the performers — such as Plácido Domingo, Dawn Upshaw, Denyce Graves and Mirella Freni. Recent trips include productions of the Virginia Opera, the Washington Opera, the New York City Opera, Russia's Kirov Opera, and the Metropolitan Opera. Additionally, vocal and instrumental students have traveled and performed outside the United States in such locations as England, Scotland, France, Italy, and Austria.

Notable alumni 

Paige Jennifer Barr, "Sarah's Key"
Matt Caplan, Rent Broadway and National Tour, Spider-Man: Turn Off the Dark Original Broadway Cast
Mary Faber, How to Succeed in Business Without Really Trying Broadway, American Idiot Original Broadway Cast, Avenue Q Broadway, Saved Off-Broadway.
Grant Gustin, Glee as Sebastian Smythe, West Side Story National Tour, The Flash as Barry Allen (The Flash) 
Tiffany Haas, Wicked Broadway/National Tour, The Drowsy Chaperone National Tour
Van Hughes, American Idiot Broadway and National Tour, Hairspray Broadway, 9 to 5 Broadway
Tiffany Howard, Memphis Broadway
Ross Iannatti, Rema Hort Mann Grant.
Zachary Knighton, Happy Endings on ABC, The Hitcher
Marjorie Owens, Met National Council Auditions Winner 2006 
Emmy Raver-Lampman, Hair National Tour/Broadway, Jekyll & Hyde National Tour/Broadway, A Night with Janis Joplin Broadway, Wicked (National Tour), Hamilton
Ryan Speedo Green, Met National Council Auditions Winner 2011 
Daniel Turner, Virginia Museum of Fine Arts Award, The Pollock-Krasner Foundation Award
Adrienne Warren, Danielle in Bring It On OBC, Dreamgirls National Tour, The Wiz, Trans-Siberian Orchestra Tour, Tina Turner in Tina Turner The Musical

External links

References

Public high schools in Virginia
Magnet schools in Virginia
Schools in Norfolk, Virginia
Educational institutions established in 1987
1987 establishments in Virginia